Miguel Urive (14 February 1957 – 26 August 2019) was a Mexican luchador enmascarado, or masked professional wrestler best known under the ring name Dr. Karonte. He was not the original "Dr. Karonte", originally working under the name "Gorhk" and in the 1980s began working as "Dr. Karonte III", teaming with the original Dr. Karonte and Dr. Karonte II. He later changed his name to just "Dr. Karonte".

Urive is the father of wrestlers Astro Boy, Argos, Argenis, Carístico and Dr. Karonte Jr. (known as La Dinatía Karonte/The Karonte Dynasty), the uncle of wrestlers Magnus and Ulises Jr. as well as the brother of CMLL booker Tony Salazar.

Personal life
He is the father of Astro Boy, Argos, Argenis, Carístico, and Karonte Jr. His  brother, Tony Salazar, is a retired wrestler who ended up working for Consejo Mundial de Lucha Libre (CMLL) as both a trainer and a booker,  Salazar's son Magnus also works for CMLL.

Urive's death was announced by his family on 26 August 2019.

Shared identity
Dr. Karonte / Dr. Karonte I
Manuel Almanza – The original Dr. Karonte, adopted the character and mask in 1960s.
Version 2 – The adopted son of Manuel Almanza, took over the role when his father retired.
Dr. Karonte II
Pascal de la Rosa – First tag team partner or Dr. Karonte I.
Ben Ali Pasha – The second person to work under the name.
Caballero de la Cruz – Third and final tag team partner of Dr. Karonte I.
Dr. Karonte III – Miguel Urive, dropped the "III" when Dr. Karonte I and II retired.
Dr. Karonte Jr. (sons of Miguel Urive)
Carístico – used the name and mask early in his career.
Argenis – used the name and mask early in his career. Also worked as "El Hijo del Karonte"
Karonte Jr. – Previously worked as "Mini Monster Clown" and is occasionally billed as Dr. Karonte Jr. and Mini Karonte

References 

2019 deaths
Masked wrestlers
Mexican male professional wrestlers
Professional wrestlers from Mexico City
Place of death missing
1957 births